Šimon Pánek (born 27 December 1967) is the executive director of the Czech humanitarian organisation People in Need (Člověk v tísni), which he co-founded in 1992. He is also a former Czech student activist who was notable for his activities during the CzechoslovakVelvet Revolution in 1989. 

Under Pánek's leadership, People in Need (PIN) has become the biggest non-governmental organisation in Central and Eastern Europe and works worldwide to mitigate people's suffering in times of crisis. PIN has become highly respected in the Czech Republic and abroad for its international and national efforts.

Life
In 1988, Šimon Pánek and Jaromír Štětina organised humanitarian assistance for Armenia, collecting various materials to help people affected by the earthquake. One year later, in 1989, Pánek became one of "student leaders" of the Velvet Revolution in Czechoslovakia, where he was involved in organising anti-regime strikes and became a co-chairman of the Central Students Strike Committee.

In 1992, he founded the news agency Epicentrum, which specialises in global conflict reporting. In 1992, Šimon Pánek co-founded Nadace Lidových novin (The Lidové noviny Foundation), now known as People in Need (PIN). Pánek was also a foreign policy specialist on the Balkan region and human rights issues abroad in the presidential administration of Václav Havel. 
  
Since 2004, Pánek chaired the Czech NGO development platform FoRS. He received the Czech State Medal of Merit in 2002 and the European of the Year Award in 2003. 

Furthermore, Šimon Pánek chaired the Board of the Open Society Fund Prague, is a member of the European Council on Foreign Relations, of the Board of the European Partnership for Democracy and of the Board of Eurostep.

Publication
With Marek Benda and Monika Pajerová,  (students wrote a revolution), Praha. Univerzum. 1990,

Honours
European of the Year in 2002 by the Reader's Digest magazine

President of Alliance 2015

References

External links
 People in Need (English version)
 Interview with One on One/ Radio Praha

1967 births
Living people
Czech humanitarians
Czech democracy activists
Czech human rights activists